Walter Herbert McCartney (April 26, 1909 – September 6, 1978) was a Canadian professional ice hockey forward who played 2 games in the National Hockey League for the Montreal Canadiens. McCartney was born in Weyburn, Saskatchewan. He died in Portland, Oregon and is buried in the Skyline Memorial Gardens.

References

External links
 

1909 births
1978 deaths
Calgary Tigers players
Canadian ice hockey forwards
Ice hockey people from Saskatchewan
Montreal Canadiens players
Sportspeople from Weyburn
Canadian expatriates in the United States